Long-chain fatty acid transport protein 3 is a protein that in humans is encoded by the SLC27A3 gene.

In melanocytic cells SLC27A3 gene expression may be regulated by MITF.

See also
 
 Solute carrier family

References

Further reading

Solute carrier family